Sīvali is an arhat widely venerated among Theravada Buddhists. He is the patron saint of travel and is believed to ward off misfortunes at home such as fire or theft. His veneration predates the introduction of Theravada Buddhism into Burma.

Sīvali is typically depicted standing upright and carrying a walking staff, an alms bowl and Buddhist prayer beads. Born to Queen Suppavasa, Sīvali is believed to have remained in his mother's womb for seven years because of past karma. After a week in labor, Sīvali's mother gave birth to a precocious boy who could immediately speak. Thereafter, Gautama Buddha's chief disciple, Sariputta, admitted Sīvali into the sangha. The Burmese believe that worshiping him will bring them prosperity and good fortune.

See also

Arahant
 Upagupta
Shin Upagutta
Ari Buddhism

References

Foremost disciples of Gautama Buddha
Buddhism in Myanmar
Arhats
Folk saints